Thomas Arne Roth (born 11 February 1991 in Sand) is a Norwegian middle-distance runner specialising in the 800 metres. He reached the final at the 2012 European Championships finishing eighth.

His brother, Andreas, is also a runner.

International competitions

Personal bests
Outdoor
400 metres – 47.93 (Kristiansand 2012)
600 metres – 1:18.24 (Nittedal 2014)
800 metres – 1:45.75 (Oslo 2018)
1000 metres – 2:21.14 (Gothenburg 2015)
1500 metres – 3:43.11 (Jessheim 2018)
One mile – 4:09.03 (Oslo 2015)
Indoor
600 metres – 1:20.21 (Stange 2010)
800 metres – 1:47.26 (Wien 2015)
1000 metres – 2:20.96 (Hvam 2018) NR
1500 metres – 3:46.19 (Hvam 2016)

References

1991 births
Living people
Norwegian male middle-distance runners
People from Ullensaker
Norwegian people of Swedish descent
Ullensaker/Kisa IL athletes
Sportspeople from Viken (county)